Mekhora (lit. Homeland) is an Israeli settlement organized as a moshav in the West Bank. It was built on lands confiscated by the Israel Defense Forces from the Palestinian villages of Al-Jiftlik, Beit Dajan and Beit Furik.

Located in the Jordan Valley, it falls under the jurisdiction of Bik'at HaYarden Regional Council.

The international community considers Israeli settlements in the West Bank illegal under international law, but the Israeli government disputes this.

History
According to ARIJ, in 1980 Israel confiscated 438 dunams of land from the Palestinian villages of Al-Jiftlik, Beit Dajan and Beit Furik in order to construct Mekhora.

The moshav was founded in 1973 by a Nahal brigade, and was originally named Nahal Mekhora.

References

Israeli settlements in the West Bank
Moshavim
Agricultural Union
Nahal settlements
Populated places established in 1973
1973 establishments in the Israeli Military Governorate